The Isle of Wight Wildcats are a Youth (Under 18) Ice hockey team based in Ryde on the Isle of Wight and are coached by Justin Attrill. They are sponsored by Wightlink and play in the second-tier of the South under 18 youth Ice hockey league (formally an under 19 league). The Wildcats are a source for the Wightlink Raiders and the Vectis Tigers  to find junior talent, if needed. The Wildcats won the Southern B League in 2001 and gained promotion to the Southern A League, but were relegated the very next year.
       
Many former Wildcats now play in the ENIHL for the Vectis tigers due to the change in age groups of British hockey from under 19s to under 18s.

References
http://www.eurohockey.com/club/2037-isle-of-wight-wildcats.html

Ice hockey teams in England
Sport on the Isle of Wight